Rick Blangiardi (born September 15, 1946) is an American television executive and politician from the state of Hawaii. Blangiardi was elected mayor of Honolulu in the 2020 mayoral election, and took office on January 2, 2021. He previously worked in the television industry and helped consolidate KHNL and KGMB into Hawaii News Now. 

A political independent, Blangiardi describes himself as socially liberal and fiscally conservative.

Early life and career
Blangiardi was born on September 15, 1946, in Cambridge, Massachusetts, and was raised there in a tenement. He signed a letter of intent to play college football for Boston College, but when his father, a munitions expert in the United States Navy, was transferred to Naval Station Pearl Harbor, he chose to attend the University of Hawaiʻi at Mānoa. Blangiardi played football for the Hawaii Rainbow Warriors as a linebacker; he was a letterman for the Rainbow Warriors in 1965 and 1966.

When his mother moved back to Massachusetts, Blangiardi transferred to Springfield College, where he played for the football team and completed his Bachelor of Science in physical education and biology in 1969. From 1972 to 1976, he served as an assistant coach for the Rainbow Warriors under head coaches Dave Holmes and Larry Price. Blangiardi was the defensive coordinator and associate head coach under Price. He earned a Master of Arts in educational administration at the University of Hawaiʻi in 1973.

Television career
Needing more income to raise his family, Blangiardi left football to work in television. He worked at KGMB from 1977 to 1984. He was vice president and general manager of KIKU (now KHNL) from 1984 to 1989. Blangiardi left Hawaii to become the general manager of KING-TV in Seattle in October 1989. He was fired in February 1992, when the station was sold to new owners. CBS hired him as vice president of new business in June 1992. 

In 1993, he became vice president and general manager at KPIX-TV in San Francisco. He was hired as president of River City Broadcasting in St. Louis in 1994, and after its sale to Sinclair Broadcast Group, became the chief executive officer of the Premier Horse Network in 1997. He worked as chief operating officer and managing director of the talent firm Brad Marks International in 1999, and was hired that year by Telemundo to oversee its eight affiliates.

In 2002, Blangiardi returned to Hawaii as the senior vice president and general manager of KHON-TV and KGMB. He left KHON in 2006 when Emmis Communications sold the station. After the 2008 recession, Blangiardi led the consolidation of KGMB and KHNL into Hawaii News Now.

Political career
In January 2020, Blangiardi announced his retirement from television. The next month, he announced his candidacy in the 2020 Honolulu mayoral election. He was endorsed by former Republican governor Linda Lingle, the University of Hawaiʻi Professional Assembly, and the State of Hawaii Organization of Police Officers (SHOPO) (the Honolulu Police Department's police union). 

In the August 8 nonpartisan blanket primary, Blangiardi finished first with 25.7% of the vote. He defeated Keith Amemiya, 58.2% to 38.8%, in the November general election, and was sworn into office on January 2, 2021.

Political views
Blangiardi has been described as conservative and in 2005 and 2004 donated to the Republican Party and George W. Bush, respectively, but is not a registered member of the Republican Party and is labeled an independent. 

Blangiardi voted for Donald Trump in the 2016 presidential election, and said, "I think a lot of his policies, despite his personal antics, have been effective". He also said that he has voted for both Democrats and Republicans in the past.

Personal life
Blangiardi has three children.

References

External links

1946 births
American football linebackers
American television executives
Hawaii Independents
Hawaii Rainbow Warriors football coaches
Hawaii Rainbow Warriors football players
Living people
Mayors of Honolulu
People from Cambridge, Massachusetts
Springfield Pride football players
Springfield College (Massachusetts) alumni
University of Hawaiʻi at Mānoa alumni